Geoffrey King (sometimes spelled Geoffry) was an English Protestant theologian, a Fellow and Regius Professor of Hebrew at King's College, Cambridge. He was among the First Westminster Company charged by James I of England with the translation of the first 12 books of the King James Version of the Bible.

References
McClure, Alexander. (1858) The Translators Revived: A Biographical Memoir of the Authors of the English Version of the Holy Bible. Mobile, Alabama: R. E. Publications (republished by the Marantha Bible Society, 1984 ASIN B0006YJPI8 )
Nicolson, Adam. (2003) God's Secretaries: The Making of the King James Bible. New York: HarperCollins 

Regius Professors of Hebrew (Cambridge)
Year of birth missing
Year of death missing
Fellows of King's College, Cambridge
Translators of the King James Version
17th-century English theologians
Academics of the University of Cambridge